University of Miami Patti and Allan Herbert Business School is the business school of the University of Miami, a private research university in Coral Gables, Florida. The school was founded in 1929 and offers undergraduate BBA, full-time MBA, Executive MBA, MS, Ph.D., and non-degree executive education programs. It is one of 12 schools and colleges at the University of Miami.

History

Miami Herbert Business School was founded as the University of Miami School of Business in 1929. The school's founding came in the middle of a period of financial turmoil for the university and classes were initially held in the unfinished Anastasia Hotel, near the parcel of land that would later become the university's Coral Gables campus.

In 2017, University of Miami president Julio Frenk appointed former Harvard Business School senior associate dean and professor John Quelch as the school's dean and vice provost of executive education. Shortly after being hired, Quelch led a successful but short-lived initiative to change the school's name from the University of Miami School of Business Administration to Miami Business School. On October 15, 2019, the school's name changed again to honor Patti and Allan Herbert, a married alumni couple who have contributed approximately $100 million to the university over the course of their lifetimes. The school is currently known as the University of Miami Patti and Allan Herbert Business School.

Since its 1929 founding, Miami Herbert Business School has graduated 45,000 alumni from 130 countries, including several who have gone on to high-profile management and other leadership capacities in U.S. and global business, government, academia, thought leadership, and other business or business-related fields.

Academics

Undergraduate
Miami Herbert Business School offers two undergraduate business education degrees, a Bachelor of Business Administration and a Bachelor of Science in Business Administration. Within those degrees, the school offers majors in several specific academic disciplines.

Graduate
Miami Herbert Business School's MBA includes a full-time program, two accelerated options (an MBA and a specialty MBA in Real Estate), an online Professional MBA, and an Executive MBA (EMBA) designed for working professionals. Graduate students may also pursue several joint interdisciplinary degrees, including a JD-MBA]], a PhD-MBA]], and a Master of Science in Sustainable Business. Miami Herbert also operates a program in collaboration with the university's School of Architecture leading to a joint Bachelor of Architecture-MBA degree. All graduate programs emphasize experiential learning with students graded on portfolios they develop in their coursework.

Miami Herbert also offers a joint M.D.-MBA degree in conjunction with the University of Miami's Leonard M. Miller School of Medicine.

Accreditations
Miami Herbert Business School is accredited by the Southern Association of Colleges and Schools Commission on Colleges and AACSB International. Its healthcare management program is accredited by the Commission on the Accreditation of Healthcare Management Education. The school received EQUIS accreditation from the European Foundation for Management Development in May 2021. Miami Herbert is also a member of Graduate Management Admission Council.

Rankings

Undergraduate program
As of 2022, Academic Ranking of World Universities ranks Miami Herbert Business School the 25th best university in the world for business administration. In 2021, Businessweek ranked Miami Herbert Business School the 46th best undergraduate business school in the nation. As of 2022, Poets and Quants ranks Miami Herbert Business School 30th best nationally and best in Florida. As of its 2022 rankings, collegiate ranking company Niche ranks Miami Herbert Business School's accounting and finance programs 18th best nationally and its economics program second best in Florida.

Graduate program
As of 2022, Miami Herbert School's MBA program is ranked the 67th best program in the nation by U.S. News & World Report and 52nd best nationally by Poets & Quants. In 2021, Financial Times ranked the school's MBA program the 93rd best MBA program in the world. Also in 2021, The Economist ranked the Miami Herbert School MBA program the 77th best MBA program in the world and 34th best in the nation. In 2021, The Economist ranked Miami Herbert's MBA faculty the eighth best MBA faculty in the world.

Notable alumni

 Ralph Alvarez, board member at Dunkin' Donuts and former chief operating officer of McDonald's
 Mercedes Aráoz, former Vice President of Peru
 Micky Arison, chairman of Carnival Corporation and owner of the Miami Heat (attended but did not graduate)
 Bakr bin Laden, former chairman of Saudi Binladin Group and half-brother of al-Qaeda terrorist Osama bin Laden
Juan Carlos Escotet, Spanish-Venezuelan billionaire banker and founder of Banesco, Venezuela's largest private financial institution
 Lyor Cohen, global head of music for Google and YouTube
 John W. Creighton Jr., former president and chief executive officer of Weyerhaeuser and UAL Corporation
Mario Cristobal, head football coach for the University of Miami
Dany Garcia, former chairwoman and owner of XFL professional football league, film producer, and former wife and manager of Dwayne Johnson
 Patti and Allan Herbert, philanthropists
 Michael Johns, health care executive and former White House presidential speechwriter
 David Komansky, former chairman and chief executive officer of Merrill Lynch
 Porfirio Lobo Sosa, former President of Honduras
 Rohan Marley, co-founder of Jamaica-based Jammin Java and son of late reggae musician Bob Marley
 Jorge Mas, chief executive officer of MasTec and chairman of the Cuban American National Foundation
 Dan Radakovich, athletic director at the University of Miami
 Mark Richt, ACC Network college football analyst and former University of Miami head football coach
 Drew Rosenhaus, professional sports agent, National Football League 
 Matthew Rubel, former chairman, chief executive officer, and president of Payless ShoeSource
 Andy Unanue, managing partner of AUA Private Equity Partners and former chief operations officer of Goya Foods
 Martin Zweig, former investment advisor and author of Winning on Wall Street

Notable past and present faculty
Alex Azar, senior executive in residence
Henrik Cronqvist, former vice dean and professor, finance
Aquiles Este, lecturer, brand management
Yadong Luo, professor of international business strategy
Linda L. Neider, professor, management
John Quelch, dean
Donna Shalala, University of Miami board of trustees presidential chairperson and professor emeritus
Neil Wallace, former professor, economics
Noah Williams, professor of economics

References

External links
Official website

Business schools in Florida
Educational institutions established in 1929
Education in Miami
University of Miami
1929 establishments in Florida